Gary or Garry Scott may refer to:
Gary Scott (footballer) (born 1978), English footballer
Gary Scott (baseball) (born 1968), baseball player
Gary Scott (cricketer) (born 1984), English cricketer
Gary Scott (racing driver), Australian touring car racing driver, 3rd place in the 1986 James Hardie 1000
Gary S. Scott, American film composer 
Garry Scott (born 1954), Australian rules footballer

See also
 Gary Scott Thompson, screenwriter and producer
 Gary Scott AA Provincial Championships, Canadian Football high school football championships